The Australasian Antarctic Expedition, under the leadership of Douglas Mawson, left Hobart, Tasmania, on 2 December 1911 in SY Aurora. Members of the expedition were organised into three parties, two in bases established on the Antarctic mainland and the third on the sub-Antarctic Macquarie Island. The Main Party base, under Mawson, was established at Cape Denison in Commonwealth Bay, at 67°0'S, 142°40'E. A Far Western party, under Frank Wild, was based on the Shackleton Ice Shelf, at 66°0'S, 100°E. The Macquarie Island base under George Ainsworth, as well as carrying out meteorological and other observations, acted as a wireless relay station connecting the Antarctic to Hobart.

Aurora, the expedition's ship, conducted a series of oceanographic surveys as part of the expedition and was captained by John King Davis, who also acted as the expedition's second-in-command.

Land parties

Main Base

Western Base

Macquarie Island

Aurora

Officers

Crew 
More than 90 persons are listed by the Australian government's Antarctic Division as serving on Aurora during the duration of the expedition, including the crew that brought the ship from London to Australia in 1911.  In general, the crews changed for each of the Antarctic cruises, but a few served on more than one cruise.

Others 
Mawson names several others who took part in one or more of the Aurora cruises, but were not members of the  landing parties: Captain James Davis, a whaling authority; C.C. Eitel, the expedition's secretary; T.T. Flynn, biologist; E.R. Waite, biologist; J. van Waterschoot, marine artist.

References

Citations

Sources

External links 

Australia and the Antarctic
New Zealand and the Antarctic
1911 in Antarctica
1912 in Antarctica
1913 in Antarctica
1914 in Antarctica
Australasian Antarctic Expedition
Antarctic expeditions
Heroic Age of Antarctic Exploration